Dysaethria obscuraria is a moth of the family Uraniidae first described by Frederic Moore in 1887. It is found in India, Sri Lanka and Taiwan.

References

Moths of Asia
Moths described in 1887
Uraniidae